The Seljuk star is an ancient Turkish national symbol (Tamga). It is one of the most common symbols in Seljuk architecture, carved on medrese and on the walls of mosques.

See also 
 Divriği Great Mosque and Hospital
 Sırçalı Medrese
 Armenian eternity sign
 Borjgali
 Rub El Hizb
 Lists of national symbols

References

National symbols of Turkey
Seljuk architecture